The 2009 Suzuka Pokka GT Summer Special was the sixth round of the 2009 Super GT season and was the 38th running of the 1000 km Suzuka event, although for the first time since 1969, the race was not 1000 km in length as in a bid to reduce CO2 emissions, the race distance was shortented to 700 km. It took place on August 23, 2009.

Race results
Results are as follows:

Statistics
GT500 Pole Position – #35 KRAFT SC430 – 1:55.724
GT300 Pole Position – #81 Daishin F430 – 2:07.439
GT500 Fastest Lap – #35 KRAFT SC430 – 1:58.093
GT300 Fastest Lap – #5 Team Mach Vemac – 2:09.282
Winner's Race Time – 4:16:02.744

References

Suzuka Pokka GT Summer Special
Suzuka